John Kitching may refer to:
John Kitching (athlete), British high jump competitor in the 1950s
John Alwyne Kitching (1908–1996), British biologist
John Howard Kitching (1838–1865), Union army officer during the American Civil War
John Kitching (physicist) at NIST, Fellow of the American Physical Society

See also
Kitching, notable people with the surname
Jack Kitching, English professional rugby league footballer in the 1940s